The Osceola Mudflow, also known as the Osceola Lahar, was a lahar in the U.S. state of Washington that descended from the summit and northeast slope of Mount Rainier during a period of eruptions about 5,600 years ago. It traveled down the west and main forks of the White River, passed the location of present-day Enumclaw then reached Puget Sound near present-day Auburn. Most of the Osceola crater has been filled in by subsequent lava eruptions, most recently about 2,200 years ago.

Many communities in King and Pierce counties, notably Kent, Enumclaw, Orting, Buckley, Sumner, Puyallup and Auburn, are wholly or partly located on top of Osceola Mudflow deposits.

The Osceola Mudflow was Mount Rainier's signature event during the Holocene epoch. It was named after the unincorporated community of Osceola.

References

Lahars
Mount Rainier
Geology of Washington (state)
Landslides in the United States
Prehistoric volcanic events
Holocene events